The Ministry of Agriculture, Forestry and Water Economy of the Republic of Serbia is the ministry in the Government of Serbia which is in the charge of agriculture, forestry and water economy. The current minister is Jelena Tanasković, in office since 26 October 2022.

Subordinate institutions
There are several agencies and institutions that operate within the scope of the Ministry:
 Veterinary Directorate
 Plant Protection Administration
 Directorate for Inland Waterways (Plovput)
 Forest Directorate
 Administration for Agrarian payments
 Administration for Agricultural land
 Directorate for National Reference Laboratories
 Environmental Protection Agency
 Republic Hydrometeorological Institute
 Republic Seismological Institute
 Agency for protection against ionizing radiation and nuclear safety
 Institutes and other institutions

List of ministers
Political Party:

See also
 Agriculture in Serbia

References

External links
 
 Serbian ministries, etc – Rulers.org

Agriculture
1991 establishments in Serbia
Ministries established in 1991
Serbia
Agricultural organizations based in Serbia